This is a list of people and organisations that engage in culture jamming.

People 
Above
Alan Abel
Banksy
Bleeps.gr
Sacha Baron Cohen in his Borat persona
Anomie Belle
Jello Biafra
Luther Blissett
Stephen Colbert
Guy Debord
Mark Dice
Ron English
Shepard Fairey
John Fekner
Rémi Gaillard
Johannes Grenzfurthner
Abbie Hoffman
Mark Jenkins
Kalle Lasn
Benjamin Lay
Ji Lee
Mark LeVine
John Lydon
Norm Magnusson
Evan Coyne Maloney
Meadow House
M.I.A.
Poster Boy
Psy
Sal Randolph
Jorge Rodriguez-Gerada
Nikolas Schiller
Joey Skaggs
Vermin Supreme
Mark Thomas
Jeff Wassmann

Organisations 
®™ark
0100101110101101.ORG
3kStatic
Adbusters
Anonymous
André the Giant Has a Posse
Anti-Pearlman Permanent Poster League
The Association for Ontological Anarchy
Barbie Liberation Organization
Billboard Liberation Front
Billionaires for Bush
Billionaires for Wealthcare
Brass Eye
The Bubble Project
BUGAUP
Burning Man
Cacophony Society
Cartrain
Chumbawamba
Church of Euthanasia
Church of the SubGenius
Cicada 3301
Crass
Critical Mass
Cutup
The Discordian Society
Emergency Broadcast Network
The Evolution Control Committee
Guerrilla Girls
Gorillaz
Graffiti Research Lab
Improv Everywhere
Improv Toronto
INDECLINE
Infringement Festival
K Foundation
The KLF
Lumber Cartel
Molleindustria
monochrom
Noisebridge
Negativland
Newmindspace
Nsumi
Operation Mindfuck
Over the Edge
 The Peng Collective
Public Image Ltd.
Publixtheatre Caravan
Pussy Riot
Regurgitator
Reverend Billy and the Church of Stop Shopping
Schwa
Situationist International
Snog
Space Hijackers
Stay Free!
StreetWars
subRosa
Sudo Room
TrustoCorp
The Yes Men
Yippies
Yomango
Whirl-Mart
The Zeitgeist Movement
Zippies

Anarchism lists
Lists of organizations
Lists of people by activity